The 1984 Bulgarian Cup Final was the 44th final of the Bulgarian Cup, and was contested between Levski Sofia and Botev Plovdiv on 2 May 1984 at Druzhba Stadium in Kardzhali. Levski won the final 1–0.

Match

Details

See also
1983–84 A Group

References

Bulgarian Cup finals
Botev Plovdiv matches
PFC Levski Sofia matches
Cup Final